Daniel Larsen Schevig (1786 – 6 October 1833) was a Norwegian military officer and constitutional founding father.

He was born at the farm Gladsjø in Beitstad, and spent his career as a farmer on Skjevik farm. He was a sergeant in the Norwegian Army, and received the Dannebrogordenens Hæderstegn in 1808 for his war efforts at Duved skanse. He was also a member of the Norwegian Constituent Assembly, representing 1. Trondhjemske Infanteriregiment. Halvdan Koht notes that Schevig "probably" favored Norwegian independence over a union with another country. Schevig was married from November 1811, and died on his farm in October 1833.

References

1786 births
1833 deaths
Norwegian Army personnel
Norwegian military personnel of the Napoleonic Wars
Fathers of the Constitution of Norway
Politicians from Nord-Trøndelag
People from Steinkjer